Brachodes candefactus is a moth of the family Brachodidae. It is found in Syria, Lebanon, Turkey (central and eastern Anatolia) and north-western Iran. The habitat consists of grass steppe in mountainous areas.

The wingspan is 14–20 mm. The forewing ground colour is black, covered with light yellow to ochreous-yellow scales. The hindwings are brownish black, with a yellow medial spot towards the base. Adults are day-active and are on wing from the beginning of June to the end of July.

The larvae feed on Secale species.

References

Moths described in 1858
Brachodidae
Insects of Turkey